Dmitry Alexandrovich Kustanovich (born  March 29, 1970 in Minsk), nickname Kust is a Belarusian-born artist, who currently resides in Saint-Petersburg, Russia.

Kustanovich graduated from the Belarusian State Pedagogical University in 1996, served in the Soviet Army and worked as a construction worker.

He developed an original technique based on the wider use of palette knives rather than brushes. He has said:

The technique has elements of the impressionism, expressionism, primitive art, conceptual art.

Since 1996 Kustanovich has participated in a number of personal exhibitions in Minsk, Moscow, Germany, France, Lithuania, Netherlands, Portugal.

Gallery

References

External links
 Official site of Kustanovich, English vesrsion

1970 births
Living people
People from Minsk
Belarusian painters
Russian male painters
20th-century Russian painters
21st-century Russian painters
20th-century Russian male artists
21st-century Russian male artists
Maxim Tank Belarusian State Pedagogical University alumni